"Suddenly" is a single from Ashley Tisdale's debut album Headstrong, the song was released in Germany on May 2, 2008, as her fourth single there. The song was not released in the United States, and was her debut album's final single.

Composition

The song is written by Tisdale and Janice Robinson and is produced by Guy Roche. She performed the song the first and only time at the 75th Rockefeller Christmas Tree on New York City, United States. Music Beat moderately positively reviewed the song, though they claim Tisdale's vocals are not strong enough for a big ballad.

Music video

The video was directed by Scott Speer and released on November 6, 2007 as the last part of the There's Something About Ashley DVD. In the video Tisdale appears singing in a fictitious concert front of a white background. It also shows moments of the DVD in the process of recording, in this part Kara DioGuardi makes a cameo, Tisdale in different moments of her life and also during the tour of High School Musical: The Concert, at the end of the video she invites the boy (Josh Henderson, to her dressing room, she was interested in the boy before and knew him in the start of the trilogy in the video "He Said She Said".

Track listings
Maxi CD single
 "Suddenly"  – 3:40
 "Who I Am"  – 3:17
 "It's Life"  – 3:47
 "Suddenly"  – 4:09

2-tracks edition
 "Suddenly"  – 3:40
 "Who I Am"  – 3:17

Charts

Credits and personnel
Lead vocals – Ashley Tisdale
Producer – Guy Roche
Engineer – Dushyant Bhakta
Writers – Ashley Tisdale, Janice Robinson
Mixer and additional programming – Mick Guzauski
Background vocals – Janice Robinson
Piano and synths – Bruce Dukov, Guy Roche

Release history

References

2000s ballads
2008 singles
Ashley Tisdale songs
Music videos directed by Scott Speer
Pop ballads
Songs written by Janice Robinson
Songs written by Ashley Tisdale
2007 songs